John Yarbrough may refer to:
John Yarbrough (retired 2008), former director of Lee County Parks and Recreation, after whom the John Yarbrough Linear Park, Fort Myers, Florida, USA is named
John Yarbrough, author of 2014 play Petra